Carolina Del Carmen Brid Cerrud (born July 4, 1990) is a Panamanian actress, TV host, model and winner of the Miss Tourism Panamá 2011, Miss Metropolitan International 2011 and Miss Panama 2013 beauty pageants. She represented Panama at the Miss Universe 2013 pageant.

Early life
Born in Ciudad de Panamá, Brid graduated from Enrico Fermi Italian High School, where she was a member of the basketball team.  She is currently a student of Social Communications at Santa María La Antigua Catholic University (USMA) in Panama City, Panama.  She speaks Spanish, English, and Italian, and is 5' 11'' (1.80 m).

Miss Tourism International 2011

In 2011, Brid won Miss Tourism Panamá, and went on to participate in the Miss Tourism International 2011 contest in Malaysia, ranking as first runner-up. In subsequent contests, she was crowned Miss Tourism Metropolitan 2011, as well as the title of Miss Glamour.

Miss Panamá 2013

Brid competed in the national beauty pageant Miss Panamá 2013, representing the state of Veraguas. She was the favorite of the national and international press.

On April 2, 2013,  she won the Miss Panamá Contest, becoming the fourth woman from the province of Veraguas to win the title.

Brid represented Panamá at the Miss Universe 2013 pageant in Moscow, Russia on November 9, 2013. Although a favorite by fans of several pageant websites, even gaining the attention of Miss Venezuela national director Osmel Sousa who predicted Brid would make the final when she competed in the presentation show, she failed to place.

See also
 Virginia Hernández

References

External links
 Miss Panama Official Web Page

1990 births
Living people
Panamanian beauty pageant winners
Panamanian female models
Miss Universe 2013 contestants
Señorita Panamá